Papito may refer to:

 Papito (album), by Spanish pop singer Miguel Bosé
 "Papito", a song by Manu Chao from the album Próxima Estación: Esperanza
 Papito, nickname for Jorge Serguera, the head of the Cuban Institute of Radio and Television